Psilocybe caeruleoannulata is a species of psilocybin mushroom found in Uruguay and Brazil, where it grows on marshy grounds, grasslands, or pastures. It is the most common Psilocybe species in the Floresta Nacional de São Francisco de Paula, in Rio Grande do Sul, Brazil.

See also
List of psilocybin mushrooms
List of Psilocybe species

References

External links

Entheogens
Psychoactive fungi
caeruleoannulata
Fungi described in 1978
Psychedelic tryptamine carriers
Fungi of South America